Reid Lyon (born 1949) is a neuroscientist and researcher on the science of reading.

Early life and education 

He had difficulty learning to read as a child, receiving help from his mother in decoding words. He joined the army in 1966, serving for fifteen months in Vietnam, including in the Tet Offensive, winning the Bronze Star and Vietnamese Cross of Gallantry with Palm, among others. After returning home, he attended North Carolina Wesleyan University, receiving a BA in psychology in 1972, then an MA and Ph.D. in Neuroscience and Learning Disorders and Disabilities from the University of New Mexico, followed by a fellowship in neuroscience at University of New Mexico Hospital (then University of New Mexico Medical Center) the following year.

Career 
From 1992 to 2005, Lyon served as chief of the Child Development and Behavior Branch of the NICHD at the National Institutes of Health; while in this role, he advised the George W. Bush administration on education, influencing No Child Left Behind and especially the Reading First program. He also worked on the Definition Consensus Project with the International Dyslexia Association.

After leaving the NIH, Lyon served in professorships at the University of Texas, Dallas and Southern Methodist University, then served at the Lee County VA Clinic in Cape Coral, Florida, helping veterans with substance abuse and PTSD.

Honors 
Lyon is a Distinguished Scientist Emeritus in Neuroscience and Cognition at the Center for BrainHealth  at the University of Texas, Dallas and a Distinguished Professor Emeritus at Southern Methodist University. He received the 2000 Samuel Torrey Orton Award   from and gave the 2005 Norman Geschwind Memorial Lecture to the International Dyslexia Association.

Footnotes 

1949 births
Living people
American neuroscientists